The following is the filmography and stage work of Academy Award winning actress and director Helen Hunt.

Filmography

Film

Television

Director

Stage

References

External links

Hunt, Helen
Hunt, Helen